Murder in Suburbia is a British television drama series first broadcast on ITV on 13 March 2004. The series focuses on the work of DS Emma Scribbins (Lisa Faulkner) and DI Kate Ashurst (Caroline Catz), police detectives assigned to the murder squad of the fictional suburban English town of Middleford. In this capacity, they are supervised by DCI Jeremy Sullivan (Jeremy Sheffield).

Filming for the series took place in Northwood and other locations in Northwest London. A second series was broadcast in 2005, but did not achieve the ratings of the first series, and the programme was subsequently axed by the network. Both series have since been released on DVD. In Japan and other regional territories, the series was renamed Ash and Scribbs.

Critical reception
Rupert Smith of The Guardian said of the second series premiere; "Dramas about murdered schoolgirls aren't usually my cup of gore, but this was played so much for laughs that I could almost forgive the opening scene of a terrified child running through a graveyard before meeting her killer's blade. Thereafter it spun cheerfully along as a tale of rural witchcraft, complete with a wise priest who kept a book about demonology on his lectern; I don't know what the Synod would have to say about that. There were hex dolls, blood rituals and quite a lot of firm naked flesh on display, which made Murder in Suburbia comfortingly like an ancient Hammer movie. Caroline Catz and Lisa Faulkner remained well-dressed and wisecracking throughout; more importantly, the show gave work to Clare Clifford, whom I worshipped as homely Shirley in Angels all those years ago."

Cast and characters

Regular cast and characters
 Caroline Catz as Detective Inspector Kate Ashurst ("Ash")
 Lisa Faulkner as Detective Sergeant Emma Scribbins ("Scribbs")
 Jeremy Sheffield as Detective Chief Inspector Jeremy Sullivan

Recurring cast and characters
 Glen Davies as Police Constable Tony Gallimore
 Stuart Nurse as Doctor David Weatherall, Police Pathologist

Episode list

Series 1 (2004)

Series 2 (2005)

References

External links
 
 

2004 British television series debuts
2005 British television series endings
2000s British crime drama television series
2000s British mystery television series
2000s British police procedural television series
2000s British workplace drama television series
British detective television series
Carlton Television
English-language television shows
ITV crime dramas
ITV mystery shows
Murder in television
Television series by ITV Studios
Television shows set in London